Sgiath Chùil is a mountain situated in the southern highlands of Scotland. It stands within Loch Lomond and the Trossachs National Park, on its northern border.

Description 
In Sir Hugh Munro's original list of peaks in Scotland with a height over  that was published in the Scottish Mountaineering Club Journal in September 1891, Sgiath Chùil was listed as a top, with Meall a' Churain listed as the mountain and higher point. This error was corrected when the first revision of the list was published in 1921.

References 

Munros
Marilyns of Scotland
Mountains and hills of the Southern Highlands
Mountains and hills of Stirling (council area)